The Columbus Capitals were an indoor soccer club based in Columbus, Ohio that competed in the American Indoor Soccer Association. The club played its home games at the Columbus Convention Center from 1984–1986, then known as the Battelle Hall.

Individual Honours

Leading Goal scorer
Lesh Shkreli (1984–85) 59 Goals

Leading Point Scorer
Lesh Shkreli (1984–85) 103 Points

Year-by-year

References

Soccer clubs in Columbus, Ohio
Soccer clubs in Ohio
American Indoor Soccer Association teams
Defunct indoor soccer clubs in the United States
Sports teams in Columbus, Ohio
1984 establishments in Ohio
1986 disestablishments in Ohio
Association football clubs established in 1984
Association football clubs disestablished in 1986